Shadwell Court, Brettenham, Norfolk, England is a country house dating originally from the 18th century. Built for the Buxton baronets, the house was massively enlarged in two stages in the 19th century; in 1840-1842 by Edward Blore and then in 1856-1860 by Samuel Sanders Teulon. The house and grounds now form part of the Shadwell Nunnery Stud, owned by Hamdan bin Rashid Al Maktoum until his death in March 2021. Shadwell Court is a Grade I listed building. In 2019 the court was included in the Heritage at Risk Register due to concerns over the deterioration of its fabric.

History
The Buxton baronetage was created for Robert Buxton in 1800. His grandfather, John Buxton, had built the original court, then named Shadwell Lodge, in 1727-1729 as a retreat from the main family house, Channonz Hall at Tibenham. The family's fortunes had been established by Robert Buxton (1533-1607), a successful lawyer in the service of the Duke of Norfolk. In 1841 the second baronet engaged Edward Blore to undertake a major enlargement of the house, which was completed for his widow in 1843. On their son's majority in 1850, the third baronet followed the Victorian tradition of embellishing the local church, and endowing a school, before embarking on a further enlargement of his home. The church at Brettenham, the Old College at Rushford,  and the work at the court were all entrusted to Samuel Sanders Teulon.

The costs of the Teulon rebuilding were considerable and may have contributed to the sale of the house and estate in 1898. The Buxtons had never been a hugely rich family; Jill Franklin, in her study The Gentleman's Country House And Its Plan: 1835-1914, records the income from their 10,000 acre estate in the mid-19th century as £7,260 per year. In contrast, the buyer of the estate, John Musker, was a very successful grocer who founded the Home and Colonial Stores in partnership with Julius Drewe. The Muskers owned the estate until the 1980s, when it was sold to  Hamdan bin Rashid Al Maktoum who incorporated it into his Nunnery Stud, based at Thetford. The court has not been lived in since the 1990s, and in 2019 it was placed on the Heritage at Risk Register over concerns as to its condition. The then director of The Victorian Society, Christopher Costelloe suggested, "Shadwell Court's owner can easily afford to look after this important building properly. This major country house has been neglected for far too long and it will be a scandal if it isn't put right soon". The Shadwell Stud contested the allegations of neglect, noting that over £1.6M had been spent on conserving the structure since its purchase by the Al Maktoum family.

The Shadwell estate is private and is not publicly accessible.

Architecture and description
The original Shadwell Lodge, built around 1727 for, and designed by, John Buxton, was to a standard Georgian plan, comprising three bays and three storeys. There are suggestions that John Soane undertook work at the house in the 1790s, but the Historic England listing does not record this. Due to financial constraints, the original lodge was not demolished, and the two periods of Victorian expansion saw first Blore, and then Teulon, envelop it with their own enlargements. Blore's work saw the construction of a southern, two-storey, block on the garden façade, together with the building of a service wing to the north. Teulon's extensions of the 1850s saw the reconstruction of the entrance front, and the building of a large stable range, with a colossal entrance gateway topped by a tower.

The result of Blore's, and then Teulon's, efforts, is decidedly vertiginous; Historic England notes the "balanced asymmetry and strikingly punctuated skyline". The building is of three storeys on some fronts, and four on others, with a range of turrets and towers. Jill Franklin notes the diagonal staircase tower as one of the earliest examples of its type. The building materials are Caen stone, brick and flint, with slate used for roofing. The climax of the interior is Teulon's cruciform central hall, with stained glass, an organ and a timber roof with elaborate carving by Thomas Earp. Mark Girouard, the architectural historian, considers Shadwell among Teulon's best work; "a dazzling display of Victorian fireworks, in its way a work of genius".

The grounds contain a grotto, constructed around a mediaeval well dedicated to St Chad from which the estate derives its name.

Listing designations
Historic England is the statutory body with responsibility for the listing of buildings in England. It  uses a three-tier rating system, classifying listed buildings into three categories; Grade I, the highest grade, for buildings of “exceptional interest”, Grade II*, the next grade, for buildings of “more than special interest”, and Grade II, the lowest grade, for buildings of “special interest”.

Shadwell Court is a Grade I listed building. The Clock Tower entrance to Teulon's stable courtyard is listed Grade II*, while the stables themselves, a brewery, a game larder, and a fountain, all in the stable courtyard, are listed Grade II. The gardens of Shadwell Court are designated Grade II on the Register of Historic Parks and Gardens, while an eighteenth-century wall, dating from the time of the original lodge, and a gardener's cottage, possibly by Blore, are designated Grade II.

Notes

References

Sources
 
 
 
 

Grade I listed houses
Grade I listed buildings in Norfolk